Plan B is the eighth album by Scorn, released in August 2002 through Hymen Records. In 2000, Mick Harris returned with the band with the record company Hymen Records for Greetings from Birmingham, but eventually Harris parted ways with Hymen in 2002 after the release of Plan B. The intervening years since saw a break in recorded output (except the release of List of Takers, a live radio jam on Vivo Records in 2004) with live dates popping up periodically.

Track listing

Personnel 
Mick Harris – instruments, production, mixing
Production
Anthony Child – production and mixing (5)
Karl O'Connor – production and mixing (10)
Salt – cover art

Critical reception 
Allmusic gave Plan B four stars out of five. The BBC review praised the production and said "Listen to this in your tank".

References

External links 
 

2002 albums
Scorn (band) albums
Albums produced by Mick Harris